The DigiYatra is a Biometric Enabled Seamless Travel (BEST) experience based on facial recognition technology. It aims to provide a paperless and seamless travel experience to passengers.

History 
DigiYatra was launched on 1 December 2022 by civil aviation minister Jyotiraditya Scindia in first phase in Bangalore and Varanasi.

See also 
Facial recognition system

References 

Modi administration initiatives
Face recognition
Ministry of Civil Aviation (India)
Ministry of Tourism (India)